Starehe Constituency is an electoral constituency in Kenya. It is one of seventeen constituencies in Nairobi City County. It consists of central and central to north areas of Nairobi. It borders Westlands Constituency to the north; Mathare Constituency to the northeast; Kamukunji and Makadara constituencies to the east; Embakasi South Constituency to the south; Dagoretti North, Kibra and Lang'ata constituencies to the west.

Members of Parliament

Electoral wards 
Following the 2013 election, Starehe six electoral wards are Nairobi Central, Ngara, Pangani, Landimawe, South B and Ziwani/ Kariokor.

Starehe Sub-county
The Sub-county partly shares the same boundaries with Starehe Constituency. The Sub-county is headed by the sub-county administrator, appointed by a County Public Service Board.

References

External links 
Starehe Constituency
Map of the constituency
Uchaguzikenya.com - Constituency profile

Constituencies in Nairobi
1966 establishments in Kenya
Constituencies established in 1966